James McIntire may refer to:

James McIntire (author), late 19th century author who wrote about his experiences as a Texas Ranger
James McIntire (politician) (born 1953), State Treasurer of Washington

See also
James McIntyre (disambiguation)